Principal Place is a 15-storey office block in Shoreditch, London, designed by Foster and Partners and completed in 2016. It is occupied by the internet retailer Amazon.com as its UK headquarters. It is situated at the eastern end of Worship Street, close to the boundary of the City of London, and with the main entrance approached from Shoreditch High Street.

In July 2014, it was reported that Amazon was close to signing a lease to move its UK headquarters there. The project had been on hold since January 2012, when the anchor tenant, the law firm CMS Cameron McKenna, pulled out. Soon after, the developer Hammerson sold its interest in the scheme to Brookfield. Amazon moved into the block in 2018.

Alongside Principal Place, and built as part of the same development, stands a 50-storey residential tower called Principal Tower.

Archaeology
The development stands on part of the site of the extramural northern cemetery of Roman Londinium, and adjacent to Roman Ermine Street. An archaeological excavation undertaken in 2012, prior to the commencement of building work, discovered a hoard of 133 Roman coins (19 gold solidi and 114 silver siliquae; roughly equivalent to some 12 years' earnings for a late 4th-century legionary). The latest was dated to A.D. 397–402, and the hoard is thought to have been buried at the end of the first decade of the fifth century.

See also
 One Rathbone Square, Facebook UK headquarters, north of Oxford Street

References

Amazon (company)
Information technology company headquarters in the United Kingdom
Office buildings in London
Shoreditch
Buildings and structures in the London Borough of Hackney